Edward James Hannan FAA FASSA (29 January 1921 – 7 January 1994) was an Australian statistician who is the co-discoverer of the Hannan–Quinn information criterion. He studied at the University of Melbourne and completed a PhD at the Australian National University under the supervision of Patrick A. P. Moran.

For the majority of his working life he was attached the Australian National University. He was Professor of Statistics in the Institute of Advanced Studies 1971-1986, Professor of Statistics in the School of General Studies 1959-1971, and Fellow in Statistics 1954-1958.

His research was in the field of time series analysis, both in statistics and econometrics.

The Statistical Society of Australia awarded him the Pitman Medal in recognition of his life's work. In 1970 he was elected to the Australian Academy of Science. He also won the 1979 Thomas Ranken Lyle Medal of the Australian Academy of Science.

A full account of his life and work is contained in the Biographical Memoirs of the Australian Academy of Science.

Hannan is the namesake of the Hannan Medal awarded by the Australian Academy of Science.

References

Australian statisticians
1994 deaths
1921 births
Fellows of the Australian Academy of Science
20th-century Australian mathematicians
Fellows of the Econometric Society